The 1945 South Carolina Gamecocks football team was an American football team that represented the University of South Carolina as a member of the Southern Conference (SoCon) during the 1945 college football season. In their first and only season season under head coach John D. McMillan, the Gamecocks compiled an overall record of 2–4–3 with a mark of 0–2–2 in conference play, placing tenth in the SoCon. South Carolina was invited to the Gator Bowl, where the lost to Wake Forest.

Schedule

References

South Carolina
South Carolina Gamecocks football seasons
South Carolina Gamecocks football